The giant Atlas barbel (Labeobarbus reinii) was a ray-finned fish species in the family Cyprinidae. It is now thought to be extinct.

It does seem to be fairly close to the core group around the typical barbels (Barbus, Luciobarbus and Messinobarbus). But it is closer still to Carasobarbus and the yellowfish (Labeobarbus), and either is a lineage of the former, or part of a distinct genus, or included in the latter (maybe together with the former). Initially classified in the genus Barbus, it was transferred to the genus Labeobarbus in 2010. The specific name honours the geographer, author and traveler Johannes Justus Rein (1835-1918), who, with Karl von Fritsch, collected the type from the Tensift River in Morocco.

It was endemic to Morocco, where its natural habitats were the Kasab and Tensift Rivers. The species was once plentiful, water pollution (particularly with domestic waste) and unsustainable water extraction (particularly for irrigation agriculture) have caused it to suffer declines, and was last seen in 2001. It was reclassified as extinct by the IUCN in 2022.

References

reinii
Endemic fauna of Morocco
Taxa named by Albert Günther
Fish described in 1874
Taxonomy articles created by Polbot